The Greatest Hits is a 1986 compilation album by Bonnie Tyler.  Released by Telstar Records, it was later released by Sony International in 1991.

Track listing

Charts

Certifications

References

1986 compilation albums
Bonnie Tyler compilation albums